The Oman cricket team toured the United Arab Emirates to play the United Arab Emirates cricket team in October 2016. The tour consisted of three List A cricket matches. Former England cricketer Owais Shah was the coaching consultant for the UAE during the tournament, and was given a three-month contract following the conclusion of the fixtures.

The United Arab Emirates won the 3-match series 2–1.

Squads

List A series

1st List A

2nd List A

3rd List A

References

External links
 Series home at ESPNcricinfo

2016 in Emirati cricket
2016 in Omani cricket
International cricket competitions in 2016–17
2016-17
Oman 2017